(The) True Briton may refer to:

 The True Briton (magazine), an English weekly magazine
  – one of several vessels by that name
 – one of four vessels by that name that sailed for the British East India Company